The People of Hemsö (Swedish: Hemsöborna) is a 1944 Swedish historical drama film directed by Sigurd Wallén and starring Adolf Jahr, Dagmar Ebbesen and Emil Fjellström. It was shot at the Sundbyberg Studios in Stockholm and on location on Vindö. The film's sets were designed by the art director Max Linder. It was based on the 1887 novel The People of Hemsö by August Strindberg. It was subsequently remade as a 1955 film of the same title.

Cast
 Adolf Jahr as 	Carlsson
 Dagmar Ebbesen as 	Madam Flod
 Peter Höglund as 	Gusten
 Sigurd Wallén as 	Rundqvist
 Emil Fjellström as 	Nordström
 Nils Hallberg as 	Norman
 Alice Skoglund as Clara
 Ann-Margret Bergendahl as Lotten 
 Elsa Ebbesen as 	Mrs. Nordström 
 Hugo Björne as 	Professor
 Anna-Greta Krigström as 	Ida
 Birgit Johannesson as 	Lina 
 Siegfried Fischer as 	Rapp 
 Nils Hultgren as 	Fiddle Player
 Knut Frankman as Islander
 Gerda Björne as 	Professor's Wife
 Gun Persson as 	Professor's Daughter
 Millan Fjellström as 	Woman at wedding 
 Torsten Hillberg as Doctor 
 Albert Johansson as 	Guest at wedding 
 Annalisa Wenström as Girl

References

Bibliography 
 Qvist, Per Olov & von Bagh, Peter. Guide to the Cinema of Sweden and Finland. Greenwood Publishing Group, 2000.

External links 
 

1944 films
1944 drama films
1940s Swedish-language films
Films directed by Sigurd Wallén
Films set in the 1880s
Swedish historical drama films
1940s historical drama films
Films based on Swedish novels
Films based on works by August Strindberg
1940s Swedish films